To be sardonic is to be disdainfully or cynically humorous, or scornfully mocking. 
A form of wit or humour, being sardonic often involves expressing an uncomfortable truth in a clever and not necessarily malicious way, often with a degree of skepticism.

Origin
Both the concept and the etymology of the word, while being of uncertain origin, appear to stem from the Mediterranean island of Sardinia. The 10th-century Byzantine Greek encyclopedia Suda traces the word's earliest roots to the notion of grinning in the face of danger, or curling one's lips back at evil.

One explanation for the later alteration to its more familiar form and connection to laughter (supported by the Oxford English Dictionary) appears to stem from an ancient belief that ingesting the sardonion (σαρδόνιον) plant from Sardinia (Σαρδώ) would result in convulsions resembling laughter and, ultimately, death. In Theory and History of Folklore, Vladimir Propp discusses alleged examples of ritual laughter accompanying death and killing, all involving groups. These he characterized as sardonic laughter:

Among the very ancient people of Sardinia, who were called Sardi or Sardoni, it was customary to kill old people. While killing their old people, the Sardi laughed loudly. This is the origin of notorious sardonic laughter (Eugen Fehrle, 1930). In light of our findings things begin to look different. Laughter accompanies the passage from death to life; it creates life and accompanies birth. Consequently, laughter accompanying killing transforms death into a new birth, nullifies murder as such, and is an act of piety that transforms death into a new life.

A root form may first appear in Homer's Odyssey as the Ancient Greek sardánios, altered by influence of the word Sardonios (Σαρδονιος, "Sardinian"), originated from a Greek phrase which meant "to be sneered", "tearing of flesh" or for scornful laughter. In the English vernacular, it was recorded and utilized in Edmund Spenser's  "The Shepheard’s Calendar" (1579).

Risus sardonicus

Risus sardonicus is an apparent smile on the face of those who are convulsing because of tetanus or strychnine poisoning. From the Oxford English Dictionary, "A fixed, grin-like expression resulting from spasm of facial muscles, esp. in tetanus." Also:

[Convulsion of the] facial muscles may cause a characteristic expression called Risus sardonicus (from the Latin for scornful laughter) or Risus caninus (from the Latin for doglike laughter or grinning). This facial expression has also been observed among patients with tetanus. Risus sardonicus causes a patient's eyebrows to rise, eyes to bulge, and mouth to retract dramatically, resulting in what has been described as an evil-looking grin.

Hemlock water dropwort 
In 2009 scientists at the University of Eastern Piedmont claimed to have identified hemlock water dropwort as the plant responsible for producing the sardonic grin. This plant is the candidate for the "sardonic herb", which was a neurotoxic plant used for the ritual killing of elderly people in pre-Roman Sardinia. When these people were unable to support themselves, they were intoxicated with this herb and then dropped from a high rock or beaten to death.

See also 

 Bittersweet
 Euphemisms
 Irony
 Rapport
 Roasting
 Sarcasm
 Schadenfreude
 Self-parody
 Evil laughter

References 

Definition, meaning, and social examples of the word Sardonic Sardonic meaning and usage example

External links 

 

Greek words and phrases
Humour
Rhetoric